Lusowo  is a village in the administrative district of Gmina Tarnowo Podgórne, within Poznań County, Greater Poland Voivodeship, in west-central Poland.

The village has a population of 1,155.

Notable people 

 Józef Dowbor-Muśnicki (1867–1937), Polish military general

 Agnieszka Dowbor-Muśnicka (7 September 1919 – 20 or 21 June 1940 ) member, Polish resistance against Nazi occupiers in World War II

References

Villages in Poznań County